Islamic mythology is the body of myths associated with Islam and the Quran. Islam is a religion that is more concerned with social order and law than with religious ritual or myths. The Oxford Companion to World Mythology identifies a number of traditional narratives as "Islamic myths". These include a creation myth and a vision of afterlife, which Islam shares with the other Abrahamic religions, as well as the distinctively Islamic story of the Kaaba.

The traditional biography of the Islamic prophet Muhammad, who plays a central role in Islamic teachings, is generally recognized as being largely historical in nature, and Islam depends less on mythology than Judaism and Christianity. However, the canonical narrative includes two key supernatural events: the divine revelation of the Quran and the Isra and Mi'raj — the night journey to Jerusalem followed by the ascension to the Seventh Heaven. In addition, Islamic scriptures contain a number of legendary narratives about biblical characters, which diverge from Jewish and Christian traditions in some details.

Religion and mythology 

The discussion of religion in terms of mythology is a controversial topic. The word "myth" is commonly used with connotations of falsehood, reflecting a legacy of the derogatory early Christian usage of the Greek word mythos in the sense of "fable, fiction, lie" to refer to classical mythology. However, the word is also used with other meanings in academic discourse. It may refer to "a story that serves to define the fundamental worldview of a culture" or to stories which a given culture regards as true (as opposed to fables, which it recognizes as fictitious).

Biblical stories in the Quran

The Quran includes many biblical narratives. Central figures, such as Moses (Musa), Abraham (Ibrahim), Joseph (Yūsuf), Mary (Maryam) and Jesus (Isa), reappear throughout the Quran. However, in contrast to the Biblical narratives, the Quran only provides a summary of a certain story, and gets into the religio-moral point, rather scattered through the Quran, instead of offering such narrations in a chronological order. More extensive details about stories incorporated by the Quran were taken from extra-Islamic sources (Isra'iliyyat). Alluding that such stories were of Jewish origin, in fact, Isra'iliyyats may also derive from other religions, such as Christianity or Zoroastrianism. Many of them were stored in Qisas Al-Anbiya (Stories of the Prophets), but also integrated in Quranic exegesis (Tafsir). Although important in early Tafsir, later scholars discouraged the usage of Isra'iliyyats. Besides narrations from the canonical Bible, Islam further adapted Apocryphal and Midrashic writings.

Creation narrative

Creation of the world

In the Quran, the heavens and the earth were joined together as one "unit of creation", after which they were "cloven asunder". After the parting of both, they simultaneously came into their present shape after going through a phase when they were smoke-like. The Quran states that the process of creation took 6 youm(يوم). In the Quran, the word youm (often translated to "era") means day.

 Ex-nihilo in time: A position especially held by most classical scholars: God existed alone in eternity, until God's command "Be", thereupon the world came into existence. This world is absolutely distinct from God. Accordingly, the world was neither created out of His own essence nor did God create the world out of a primordial matter which preceded the creation, but created by His sheer command not bound by the laws of nature.
 Emanation: Found especially among scholars such as Al-Farabi and Ibn Sina: Accordingly, the world was created out of nothing, but not in time. The world was eternal, but temporary in essence.
 Creation out of primordial matter: Maintained by scholars such as Ibn Taimiyya: God fashioned the whole world out of primordial matter, the waters and the smoke.

Creation of humanity

According to Quranic creation narrative, God informed the angels, that He was going to create a khalifa (vicegerent) on earth. The meaning of Khalifa holds different interpretations within Islamic exegesis:
Successor: Adam and his descendants replace another species, who formerly inhabited and ruled the earth. Accordingly, the jinn preceded humanity, but God decided to replace them, due to their malevolence. Whereupon God sent an army of angels to annihilate the rule of jinn. Iblis, the future devil, plays a significant role in this story, either as the angel, who led his army into battle against the jinn, whereafter he declined to acknowledge the dignity of their successors, or as one of the few pious jinn, which were spared by the angels, but became an infidel, by opposing his successor.
Deputy: Adam and his descendants are thought of as the deputy of God. Therefore, humans are obligated to maintain the earth given by God and should spiritualize God's attributes, to rule and govern it in accordance with God's will. The heavenly Adam, who has learned the names of God, functions as the prototype of Al-Insān al-Kāmil (Perfect human), which flawed humans should strive to become.

Adam is according to Islam, both the first human and the first prophet. The Quran says that he and his wife dwelled in Garden of Eden. The Quranic counterpart of the fall of man differs in some regards from the Book of Genesis. The Quran does not blame women for seducing men, since both Adam and his in the Quran unnamed wife, eat from the forbidden tree. Further, the forbidden tree is not identified as Tree of the knowledge of good and evil but as Tree of Eternity. The Quran does not mention the serpent as a symbol for the devil, but only Satan himself. While the Old Testament curses the earth for Adam's transgression, according to the Quran, God declares the earth as a dwelling place for humans, but not curses it nor is Adam destined to die for his sin, thus lacking the doctrine of original sin, prevailing in Christian theology. Islamic theology gives a more optimistic attitude towards humanity's fall. Only due to free will, humans are able to produce good. Thus, although Adam's disobedience created evil, only this made it possible to create good. The disobediences of Adam and his wife were already forgiven by God during their life.

Islamic traditions are more extensive, adding further details into the Quranic creation narrative. According to a common narrative, God ordered the Archangels to collect a handful of soil from earth. But every time an archangel approached earth, the earth sought refuge in God, that it might not be distorted. All the archangels returned empty-handed, except Azrael, who succeeded because he sought refuge in God before, for that he will not returned unsuccessful. Another common traditions, portrayed the body of Adam lying on the ground for forty years, whereupon Iblis became curious of the new creation. After investigating the lifeless body, he promised that, if he will gain authority over it, he will destroy it. In another tradition, it is not Azrael, but Iblis, included among the archangels, who succeeded in collecting soil from the earth, thus he later declined to prostrate himself before whose formation he just assisted.

There is an extensive debate among the exegetes (muffasirun) on the creation of Eve as outlined in the foundational sources - Qur'an and Hadith. Surah an-Nisa verse one says "O people! Be mindful of your Lord who created you from a single soul (nafsin wahida) and created from it, its mate (zawjaha)..." Most Muslim exegetes have interpreted this verse as suggesting that Eve (zawjaha) is the secondary creation brought forth from Adam (nafsin wahida). Karen Bauer argues that since the nature and manner of Eve's creation in the Qur'an remains obscure, exegetes had no option but to read into the text of the Qur'an using Biblical, para-Biblical accounts and older myths. It is undeniable that the first spouse, according to the Qur'anic narrative, was created from (min) and for man (lahu) (Q. 7:189), but the meaning of from (min) is not clear. The exegetes have understood this in two key ways: first, from the "crooked rib" and second, "of the same type (substance)" It is worth mentioning that the Bible presents both accounts - of the same type (Genesis 1:26-7) and from the rib (Genesis 2:20-4) (109).   

Muqatil b. Sulayman (d. 150/767), one of the earliest interpreters of the Qur'an says Eve was created from Adam's rib and this is reflected in her name - Eve (Hawwa), from the word living being (hayy). Another early exegete, Hud b. Muhakkam al-Hawwari (d. 3rd/9th century) also presents the same reading by referring it to al-Hasan al-Basri who has reported from the Prophet Muhammad that "indeed, woman was created from a rib, and if you wish to straighten her you break her." Many traditionalist exegetes like al-Tabari, Ibn Abi Hatim al-Razi, Maybudi, etc. have quoted these opinions. But others like Abu Ja'far Muhammad al-Baqir and Ibn Bahr argue that Eve was created "of the same type." In the modern period, the creation of Eve continues to be intensely debated. Pakistani scholar of the Qur'an, Israr Ahmed (d. 2010) was of the opinion that with the advances in our knowledge due to modern science, the notion of Eve's creation from Adam's rib is against human observation and reason. He believes the "crooked rib" hadith is using a metaphor to make a point regarding the psychological nature of women. Israr, in the evolution of the animal kingdom from a unicellular being like an amoeba, sees a clear indication that the creation was brought forth from the first unicellular being in which the characteristic of biological sex did not exist. Another South Asian scholar, Javed Ahmed Ghamidi, sees the hadith as a metaphor and argues that Eve was created of the same biological sex as Adam.  

Islamic traditions often use figures similar to the Biblical narrative. Adam's wife is commonly named Hawa, and the serpent reappears together with a peacock as two animals, which supported Iblis to slip into Adam's abode. Many denied, that the Garden in which Adam dwelled with his wife, was identical with the Paradise in afterlife. They rather lived in paradisical conditions before their fall, while after their fall, they need to work to survive. Unlike Christian mythology, in Islamic thought, they did not simply walk out of paradise, but fell out of it. Hawa was punished with childbirth and menstruation, while Adam became bald and the serpent lost its legs.

Regarding the creation of Muhammad, Islam developed the belief in the pre-existence of Muhammad. This posits that God created the spiritual nature of Muhammad before God created the universe or Adam. Following this belief, Muhammad was the first prophet created, but the last one sent to mankind. When Adam walked in heaven, he once read the Shahada inscripted in the Throne of God, a belief attested by Al-Bayhaqi, who attributes it to Umar. In a Shia version, the inscription also mentions Ali.

Spiritual creatures
In the Quran, fire (nar) makes up the basic substance for spiritual entities, in contrast to humans created from clay (tin). Islamic traditions state more precisely, how different spiritual creatures were created. Islamic mythology commonly acknowledges three different types of spiritual entities:

 Angels, created from light (nur) or fire (nar): the heavenly hosts, and servants of God. Eminent among them are the four Archangels (Jibra'il, Mika'il, Azra'il and Israfil), Kiraman Katibin, who record a person's good and bad deeds, Maalik, who guards the Hellfire, Munkar and Nakir, two angels questioning the dead and Harut and Marut, two angels instructed to test mankind by teaching of knowledge of magic.
 Jinn, created from a mixture of fire and air or smokeless fire: morally ambivalent creatures, can convert to Islam and are subject to salvation or damnation. Jann is usually perceived as an ancestor of the jinn.
 Shayatin,  created from smoke or fire (Samūm): comparable to Christian demons or devils, usually regarded as the offspring of Iblis, who is the head of shayatin. They tempt humans (and jinn) into sin. In Islamic folklore, Ifrit and Marid are usually two powerful classes of shayatin.

Other prominent creatures within Islamic mythological traditions are Buraq, Ghaddar, Hinn, Houris and Yajuj and Majuj (Gog and Magog). Later, spiritual entities from other cultures were identified with those of the Quran and assimilated to Islamic lore, such as Peri of Persian- Ghoul of Arabian- and İye of Turkic origin.

Places

According to popular ideas derived from cultural beliefs during the Classical Islamic period, the earth is flat, surrounded by water, which is veiled in darkness, with Mount Qaf at the edge of the visible world. Despite being flat, there is no trace of a disc-shaped earth within cosmological treatises. The heavenly dome ends at a world-serpent or  agon. Studies from Suyuti's works often give the description of the first heaven, consisting of waters enclosing the earth. The world is carried by different creatures: an angel, a bull and a fish. Zakariya al-Qazwini identified the bull and the fish with the biblical monsters, Behemoth and Leviathan. Both heaven and hell coexist with the temporary world. The seven layers of hell are identified with the seven earths. Sijjin is one of the lowest layers of hell, while Illiyin the highest layer of heaven. Hell is portrayed with the imageries of seas of fire, dungeons, thorny shrubs, the tree of Zaqqum, but also immense cold at bottom, inhabited by scorpions, serpents, zabaniyya and shayatin. The imageries heavens are described with different colors, seas of light, the tree of heaven, inhabited by angels and houris, as a Garden with sprawling meadows and flowing rivers. The inhabitants can rest on couches bedecked with silk and visit the other deads if they wish.

Islamic scholars knew the world was not flat. Islamic astronomy was developed on the basis of a spherical earth inherited from Hellenistic astronomy. The Islamic theoretical framework largely relied on the fundamental contributions of Aristotle (De caelo) and Ptolemy (Almagest), both of whom worked from the premise that the Earth was spherical and at the centre of the universe (geocentric model).

The 11th-century scholar Ibn Hazm stated: "Evidence shows that the Earth is a sphere but public people say the opposite." He added: "None of those who deserve being Imams for Muslims has denied that Earth is round. And we have not received anything indicates a denial, not even a single word."

The Kaaba
According to Islamic mythology, God instructed Adam to construct a building (called the Kaaba) to be the earthly counterpart of the House of Heaven and that Ibrahim (Abraham) and Ismail (Ishmael) later rebuilt it on its original foundations after was destroyed in the flood of Nuh (Noah). According to other opinions, Ibrahim and Ismail were the first to build it. As Ismail was searching for a stone to mark a corner with, he met with the angel Jibrail (Gabriel). Jibrail gave him the Black Stone. According to the hadith, the Black Stone is reported to have been milky white after being descended from Heaven but was rendered black due to the sins of the people, who had touched it. Muslims do not worship the Black Stone.

The Kaaba was originally intended as a symbolic house for the one monotheistic God. However, according to Islamic mythology, after Ibrahim's death, people started to fill the Kaaba with "pagan idols". When Muhammad conquered Mecca after his exile, he removed the idols from the Kaaba. The inside of the Kaaba is now empty. It now stands as an important pilgrimage site, which all Muslims are supposed to visit at least once if they are able (Hajj). Muslims are supposed to pray five times a day while facing in the Kaaba's direction (qibla).

Events
 Creation - a six-stages creative act by God
 Fall of man - expulsion from Heaven
 Deluge and Noah's (Nuh's) Ark- flood-event. Unlike Christianity, the flood might be either global or local
 The Exodus - Story of Moses leaving Egypt, whereupon God reveals Tawrat to him on biblical Mount Sinai
 Qiyamah - the Day of Resurrection; a fundamental element of Islamic eschatology that incorporates much from the Jewish and Christian traditions

In Salafi thought 
Beginning as a reaction to the Age of Enlightenment in Europe and the threat of Western colonialism, Salafi reformism sought out a more practical model to "restore the ummah", downplaying mystical, cosmic, and mythological aspects attributed to Muhammad, while simultaneously emphasizing the social and political role of the sunnah.

Many adherents of the Muslim Brotherhood reject most traditional Islamic mythological narratives. Sayyid Qutb attempted to break the connection between Khi  and the Quran, eliminating his identification with God's servant mentioned in Surah 18. Accordingly, adherents of Qutbist thought began to no longer perceive Khi  (and his corresponding mythology) as related to Islam.   The teachings of Sulaiman Ashqar disapprove of many records about the traditional material regarding angels, including the Classical scholars who used them, which has led to a marginalization of Islamic thought of angels, including names and stories regarding their origin.

See also
 Christian mythology
 Folk religion
 Jewish mythology
 Religion and mythology

Notes

References

Sources
 Huston Smith. The Religions of Man. NY: Harper & Row (Perennial Library), 1965.
 Robert A. Segal. Myth: A Very Short Introduction. NY: Oxford UP, 2004.
 Zong In-Sob. Folk Tales From Korea, Third Edition. Elizabeth: Hollym International, 1982.
 Mircea Eliade. Myth and Reality. Trans. Willard R. Trask. NY: Harper & Row (Harper Torchbooks), 1968.
 The Holy Quran. Electronic Text Center, University of Virginia Library. Available online.

External links